Wajumará is an extinct and poorly attested Cariban language. Kaufman (2007) placed it in his Makiritare branch as a close relative of Ye'kuana.

References

Cariban languages
Extinct languages